Ophthalmology is a surgical subspecialty within medicine that deals with the diagnosis and treatment of eye disorders.

An ophthalmologist is a physician who undergoes subspecialty training in medical and surgical eye care. Following a medical degree, a doctor specialising in ophthalmology must pursue additional postgraduate residency training specific to that field. This may include a one-year integrated internship that involves more general medical training in other fields such as internal medicine or general surgery. Following residency, additional specialty training (or fellowship) may be sought in a particular aspect of eye pathology.

Ophthalmologists prescribe medications to treat ailments, such as eye diseases, implement laser therapy, and perform surgery when needed.  Ophthalmologists provide both primary and specialty eye care - medical and surgical. Most ophthalmologists participate in academic research on eye diseases at some point in their training and many include research as part of their career.
Ophthalmology has always been at the forefront of medical research with a long history of advancement and innovation in eye care.

Diseases
A brief list of some of the most common diseases treated by ophthalmologists:
 Cataract
 Excessive tearing (tear duct obstruction)
 Proptosis (bulged eyes)
 Thyroid eye disease
 Eye tumors
 Ptosis
 Diabetic retinopathy
 Dry eye syndrome
 Glaucoma
 Macular degeneration
 Retinal detachment
 Endophthalmitis
 Refractive errors
 Strabismus (misalignment or deviation of eyes)
 Uveitis
 Ocular trauma
 Ruptured globe injury
 Orbital fracture

The most valued pharmaceutical companies worldwide whose leading products are in Ophthalmology are Regeneron (United States) for AMD treatment and Bausch Health (Canada) for Front of eye.

Diagnosis

Eye examination
Following are examples of examination methods performed during an eye examination that enables diagnosis
 Visual acuity assessment
 Ocular tonometry to determine intraocular pressure
 Extraocular motility and ocular alignment assessment
 Slit lamp examination
 Dilated fundus examination
 Gonioscopy
 Refraction

Specialized tests
Optical coherence tomography (OCT) is a medical technological platform used to assess ocular structures. The information is then used by physicians to assess staging of pathological processes and confirm clinical diagnoses. Subsequent OCT scans are used to assess the efficacy of managing diabetic retinopathy, age-related macular degeneration, and glaucoma.

Optical coherence tomography angiography (OCTA) and Fluorescein angiography to visualize the vascular networks of the retina and choroid.

Electroretinography (ERG) measures the electrical responses of various cell types in the retina, including the photoreceptors (rods and cones), inner retinal cells (bipolar and amacrine cells), and the ganglion cells.

Electrooculography (EOG) is a technique for measuring the corneo-retinal standing potential that exists between the front and the back of the human eye. The resulting signal is called the electrooculogram. Primary applications are in ophthalmological diagnosis and in recording eye movements.

Visual field testing to detect dysfunction in central and peripheral vision which may be caused by various medical conditions such as glaucoma, stroke, pituitary disease, brain tumours or other neurological deficits.

Corneal topography is a non-invasive medical imaging technique for mapping the anterior curvature of the cornea, the outer structure of the eye.

Ultrasonography of the eyes may be performed by an ophthalmologist.

Ophthalmic surgery

Eye surgery, also known as ocular surgery, is surgery performed on the eye or its adnexa by an ophthalmologist. The eye is a fragile organ, and requires extreme care before, during, and after a surgical procedure. An eye surgeon is responsible for selecting the appropriate surgical procedure for the patient and for taking the necessary safety precautions.

Subspecialties
Ophthalmology includes subspecialities that deal either with certain diseases or diseases of certain parts of the eye. Some of them are:
 Anterior segment surgery
 Cornea, ocular surface, and external disease
 Glaucoma
 Neuro-ophthalmology
 Ocular oncology
 Oculoplastics and orbit surgery
 Ophthalmic pathology
 Paediatric ophthalmology/strabismus (misalignment of the eyes)
 Refractive surgery
 Medical retina, deals with treatment of retinal problems through non-surgical means
 Uveitis
 Veterinary specialty training programs in veterinary ophthalmology exist in some countries.
 Vitreo-retinal surgery, deals with surgical management of retinal and posterior segment diseases

Medical retina and vitreo-retinal surgery sometimes are combined and together they are called posterior segment subspecialisation

Etymology
The Greek roots of the word ophthalmology are ὀφθαλμός ("eye") and -λoγία (-, "study, discourse"), i.e., "the study of eyes". The discipline applies to all animal eyes, whether human or not, since the practice and procedures are quite similar with respect to disease processes, although there are differences in the anatomy or disease prevalence.

History

Ancient near east and the Greek period
In the Ebers Papyrus from ancient Egypt dating to 1550 BC, a section is devoted to eye diseases.

Prior to Hippocrates, physicians largely based their anatomical conceptions of the eye on speculation, rather than empiricism. They recognized the sclera and transparent cornea running flushly as the outer coating of the eye, with an inner layer with pupil, and a fluid at the centre. It was believed, by Alcamaeon (fifth century BC) and others, that this fluid was the medium of vision and flowed from the eye to the brain by a tube. Aristotle advanced such ideas with empiricism. He dissected the eyes of animals, and discovering three layers (not two), found that the fluid was of a constant consistency with the lens forming (or congealing) after death, and the surrounding layers were seen to be juxtaposed. He and his contemporaries further put forth the existence of three tubes leading from the eye, not one. One tube from each eye met within the skull.

The Greek physician Rufus of Ephesus (first century AD) recognised a more modern concept of the eye, with conjunctiva, extending as a fourth epithelial layer over the eye. Rufus was the first to recognise a two-chambered eye, with one chamber from cornea to lens (filled with water), the other from lens to retina (filled with a substance resembling egg whites).

Celsus the Greek philosopher of the second century AD gave a detailed description of cataract surgery by the couching method.

The Greek physician Galen (second century AD) remedied some mistaken descriptions, including about the curvature of the cornea and lens, the nature of the optic nerve, and the existence of a posterior chamber. Although this model was a roughly correct modern model of the eye, it contained errors. Still, it was not advanced upon again until after Vesalius. A ciliary body was then discovered and the sclera, retina, choroid, and cornea were seen to meet at the same point. The two chambers were seen to hold the same fluid, as well as the lens being attached to the choroid. Galen continued the notion of a central canal, but he dissected the optic nerve and saw that it was solid. He mistakenly counted seven optical muscles, one too many. He also knew of the tear ducts.

Ancient India
The Indian surgeon Sushruta wrote the Sushruta Samhita in Sanskrit in approximately the sixth century BC, which describes 76 ocular diseases (of these, 51 surgical) as well as several ophthalmological surgical instruments and techniques. His description of cataract surgery was compatible with the method of couching. He has been described as one of the first cataract surgeons.

Medieval Islam

Medieval Islamic Arabic and Persian scientists (unlike their classical predecessors) considered it normal to combine theory and practice, including the crafting of precise instruments, and therefore, found it natural to combine the study of the eye with the practical application of that knowledge. Hunayn ibn Ishaq, and others beginning with the medieval Arabic period, taught that the crystalline lens is in the exact center of the eye. This idea was propagated until the end of the 1500s.

Ibn al-Haytham (Alhazen), in his Book of Optics explained that vision occurs when light lands on an object, bounces off, and is directed to one's eyes.

Ibn al-Nafis, an Arabic native of Damascus, wrote a large textbook, The Polished Book on Experimental Ophthalmology, divided into two parts, On the Theory of Ophthalmology and Simple and Compounded Ophthalmic Drugs.

Avicenna wrote in his Canon "rescheth", which means "retiformis", and Gerard of Cremona translated this at approximately 1150 into the new term "retina".

Modern Period

In the seventeenth and eighteenth centuries, hand lenses were used by Malpighi, microscopes by Leeuwenhoek, preparations for fixing the eye for study by Ruysch, and later the freezing of the eye by Petit. This allowed for detailed study of the eye and an advanced model. Some mistakes persisted, such as: why the pupil changed size (seen to be vessels of the iris filling with blood), the existence of the posterior chamber, and the nature of the retina. Unaware of their functions, Leeuwenhoek noted the existence of photoreceptors, however, they were not properly described until Gottfried Reinhold Treviranus in 1834.

Approximately 1750, Jacques Daviel advocated a new treatment for cataract by extraction instead of the traditional method of couching. Georg Joseph Beer (1763–1821) was an Austrian ophthalmologist and leader of the First Viennese School of Medicine. He introduced a flap operation for treatment of cataract (Beer's operation), as well as having popularized the instrument used to perform the surgery (Beer's knife).

In North America, indigenous healers treated some eye diseases by rubbing or scraping the eyes or eyelids.

Ophthalmic surgery in Great Britain
The first ophthalmic surgeon in Great Britain was John Freke, appointed to the position by the governors of St. Bartholomew's Hospital in 1727. A major breakthrough came with the appointment of Baron de Wenzel (1724–90), a German who became the oculist to King George III of Great Britain in 1772. His skill at removing cataracts legitimized the field. The first dedicated ophthalmic hospital opened in 1805 in London; it is now called Moorfields Eye Hospital.  Clinical developments at Moorfields and the founding of the Institute of Ophthalmology (now part of the University College London) by Sir Stewart Duke-Elder established the site as the largest eye hospital in the world and a nexus for ophthalmic research.

Central Europe
In Berlin, ophthalmologist Albrecht von Graefe introduced iridectomy as a treatment for glaucoma and improved cataract surgery, he is also considered the founding father of the German Ophthalmological Society.

Numerous ophthalmologists fled Germany after 1933 as the Nazis began to persecute those of Jewish descent. A representative leader was Joseph Igersheimer (1879–1965), best known for his discoveries with arsphenamine for the treatment of syphilis. He fled to Turkey in 1933. As one of eight emigrant directors in the Faculty of Medicine at the University of Istanbul, he built a modern clinic and trained students. In 1939, he went to the United States, becoming a professor at Tufts University. German ophthalmologist, Gerhard Meyer-Schwickerath is widely credited with developing the predecessor of laser coagulation, photocoagulation.

In 1946, Igersheimer conducted the first experiments on light coagulation. In 1949, he performed the first successful treatment of a retinal detachment with a light beam (light coagulation) with a self-constructed device on the roof of the ophthalmic clinic at the University of Hamburg-Eppendorf.

Polish ophthalmology dates to the thirteenth century. The Polish Ophthalmological Society was founded in 1911. A representative leader was Adam Zamenhof (1888–1940), who introduced certain diagnostic, surgical, and nonsurgical eye-care procedures. He was executed by the German Nazis in 1940.

Zofia Falkowska (1915–93) head of the Faculty and Clinic of Ophthalmology in Warsaw from 1963 to 1976, was the first to use lasers in her practice.

Contributions by Physicists
The prominent physicists of the late nineteenth and early twentieth centuries included Ernst Abbe (1840–1905), a co-owner of at the Zeiss Jena factories in Germany, where he developed numerous optical instruments. Hermann von Helmholtz (1821-1894) was a polymath who made contributions to many fields of science and invented the ophthalmoscope in 1851. They both made theoretical calculations on image formation in optical systems and also had studied the optics of the eye.

Professional requirements
Ophthalmologists are physicians (MD/DO in the U.S. or MBBS in the UK and elsewhere or DO/DOMS/DNB, who typically complete an undergraduate degree, general medical school, followed by a residency in ophthalmology. Ophthalmologists typically perform optical, medical and surgical eye care.

Australia and New Zealand

In Australia and New Zealand, the FRACO or FRANZCO is the equivalent postgraduate specialist qualification. The structured training system takes place over five years of postgraduate training. Overseas-trained ophthalmologists are assessed using the pathway published on the RANZCO website. Those who have completed their formal training in the UK and have the CCST or CCT, usually are deemed to be comparable.

Bangladesh
In Bangladesh to be an ophthalmologist the basic degree is an MBBS. Then they have to obtain a postgraduate degree or diploma in an ophthalmology specialty. In Bangladesh, these are diploma in ophthalmology, diploma in community ophthalmology, fellow or member of the College of Physicians and Surgeons in ophthalmology, and Master of Science in ophthalmology.

Canada
In Canada, after medical school an ophthalmology residency is undertaken. The residency typically lasts five years, which culminates in fellowship of the Royal College of Surgeons of Canada (FRCSC). Subspecialty training is undertaken by approximately 30% of fellows (FRCSC) in a variety of fields from anterior segment, cornea, glaucoma, vision rehabilitation, uveitis, oculoplastics, medical and surgical retina, ocular oncology, Ocular pathology, or neuro-ophthalmology. Approximately 35 vacancies open per year for ophthalmology residency training in all of Canada. These numbers fluctuate per year, ranging from 30 to 37 spots. Of these, up to ten spots are at French-speaking universities in Quebec. At the end of the five years, the graduating ophthalmologist must pass the oral and written portions of the Royal College exam in either English or French.

India
In India, after completing MBBS degree, postgraduate study in ophthalmology is required. The degrees are doctor of medicine, master of surgery, diploma in ophthalmic medicine and surgery, and diplomate of national board. The concurrent training and work experience are in the form of a junior residency at a medical college, eye hospital, or institution under the supervision of experienced faculty. Further work experience in the form of fellowship, registrar, or senior resident refines the skills of these eye surgeons. All members of the India Ophthalmologist Society and various state-level ophthalmologist societies hold regular conferences and actively promote continuing medical education.

Nepal
In Nepal, to become an ophthalmologist, three years of postgraduate study is required after completing an MBBS degree. The postgraduate degree in ophthalmology is called medical doctor in ophthalmology. Currently, this degree is provided by Tilganga Institute of Ophthalmology, Tilganga, Kathmandu, BPKLCO, Institute of Medicine, TU, Kathmandu, BP Koirala Institute of Health Sciences, Dharan, Kathmandu University, Dhulikhel, and National Academy of Medical Science, Kathmandu. A few Nepalese citizens also study this subject in Bangladesh, China, India, Pakistan, and other countries. All graduates have to pass the Nepal Medical Council Licensing Exam to become a registered ophthalmologists in Nepal. The concurrent residency training is in the form of a PG student (resident) at a medical college, eye hospital, or institution according to the degree providing university's rules and regulations. Nepal Ophthalmic Society holds regular conferences and actively promotes continuing medical education.

Ireland

In Ireland, the Royal College of Surgeons of Ireland grants membership (MRCSI (Ophth)) and fellowship (FRCSI (Ophth)) qualifications in conjunction with the Irish College of Ophthalmologists. Total postgraduate training involves an intern year, a minimum of three years of basic surgical training, and a further 4.5 years of higher surgical training. Clinical training takes place within public, Health Service Executive-funded hospitals in Dublin, Sligo, Limerick, Galway, Waterford, and Cork. A minimum of 8.5 years of training is required before eligibility to work in consultant posts. Some trainees take extra time to obtain MSc, MD or PhD degrees and to undertake clinical fellowships in the UK, Australia, and the United States.

Pakistan
In Pakistan, after MBBS, a four-year full-time residency program leads to an exit-level FCPS examination in ophthalmology, held under the auspices of the College of Physicians and Surgeons, Pakistan. The tough examination is assessed by both highly qualified Pakistani and eminent international ophthalmic consultants. As a prerequisite to the final examinations, an intermediate module, an optics and refraction module, and a dissertation written on a research project carried out under supervision is also assessed.

Moreover, a two-and-a-half-year residency program leads to an MCPS while a two-year training of DOMS is also being offered. For candidates in the military, a stringent two-year graded course, with quarterly assessments, is held under Armed Forces Post Graduate Medical Institute in Rawalpindi.

The M.S. in ophthalmology is also one of the specialty programs. In addition to programs for physicians, various diplomas and degrees for allied eyecare personnel are also being offered to produce competent optometrists, orthoptists, ophthalmic nurses, ophthalmic technologists, and ophthalmic technicians in this field. These programs are being offered, notably by the College of Ophthalmology and Allied Vision Sciences, in Lahore and the Pakistan Institute of Community Ophthalmology in Peshawar. Subspecialty fellowships also are being offered in the fields of pediatric ophthalmology and vitreoretinal ophthalmology. King Edward Medical University, Al Shifa Trust Eye Hospital Rawalpindi, and Al- Ibrahim Eye Hospital Karachi also have started a degree program in this field.

Philippines
In the Philippines, Ophthalmology is considered a medical specialty that uses medicine and surgery to treat diseases of the eye. There is only one professional organization in the country that is duly recognized by the PMA and the PCS: the Philippine Academy of Ophthalmology (PAO). PAO and the state-standard Philippine Board of Ophthalmology (PBO) regulates ophthalmology residency programs and board certification. To become a general ophthalmologist in the Philippines, a candidate must have completed a doctor of medicine degree (MD) or its equivalent (e.g. MBBS), have completed an internship in Medicine, have passed the physician licensure exam, and have completed residency training at a hospital accredited by the Philippine Board of Ophthalmology (accrediting arm of PAO). Attainment of board certification in ophthalmology from the PBO is essential in acquiring privileges in most major health institutions. Graduates of residency programs can receive further training in ophthalmology subspecialties, such as neuro-ophthalmology, retina, etc. by completing a fellowship program that varies in length depending on each program's requirements.

United Kingdom
In the United Kingdom, three colleges grant postgraduate degrees in ophthalmology. The Royal College of Ophthalmologists (RCOphth) and the Royal College of Surgeons of Edinburgh grant MRCOphth/FRCOphth and MRCSEd/FRCSEd, (although membership is no longer a prerequisite for fellowship), the Royal College of Glasgow grants FRCS. Postgraduate work as a specialist registrar and one of these degrees is required for specialization in eye diseases. Such clinical work is within the NHS, with supplementary private work for some consultants.

Only 2.3 ophthalmologists exist per 100,000 population in the UK – fewer pro rata than in any nations in the European Union.

United States

Ophthalmologists typically complete four years of undergraduate studies, four years of medical school and four years of eye-specific training (residency). Some pursue additional training, known as a fellowship - typically one to two years. Ophthalmologists are physicians who specialize in the eye and related structures. They perform medical and surgical eye care and may also write prescriptions for corrective lenses. They often manage late stage eye disease, which typically involves surgery.

Ophthalmologists must complete the requirements of continuing medical education to maintain licensure and for recertification.

Notable ophthalmologists
The following is a list of physicians who have significantly contributed to the field of ophthalmology:

18th–19th centuries
 Theodor Leber (1840–1917) discovered Leber's congenital amaurosis, Leber's hereditary optic neuropathy, Leber's miliary aneurysm, and Leber's stellate neuroretinitis
 Carl Ferdinand von Arlt (1812–1887), the elder (Austrian), proved that myopia is largely due to an excessive axial length, published influential textbooks on eye disease, and ran annual eye clinics in needy areas long before the concept of volunteer eye camps became popular; his name is still attached to some disease signs, e.g., von Arlt's line in trachoma and his son, Ferdinand Ritter von Arlt, the younger, was also an ophthalmologist
 Jacques Daviel (1696–1762) (France) claimed to be the founder of modern cataract surgery in that he performed cataract extraction instead of needling the cataract or pushing it back into the vitreous; he is said to have carried out the technique on 206 patients in 1752–53, of which 182 were reported to be successful, however, these figures are not very credible, given the total lack of both anaesthesia and aseptic technique at that time
 Franciscus Donders (1818–1889) (Dutch) published pioneering analyses of ocular biomechanics, intraocular pressure, glaucoma, and physiological optics and he made possible the prescribing of combinations of spherical and cylindrical lenses to treat astigmatism
 Joseph Forlenze (1757–1833) (Italy), specialist in cataract surgery, became popular during the First French Empire, healing, among many, personalities such as the minister Jean-Étienne-Marie Portalis and the poet Ponce Denis Lebrun; he was nominated by Napoleon "chirurgien oculiste of the lycees, the civil hospices and all the charitable institutions of the departments of the Empire", and he also was known for his free interventions, mainly in favour of poor people

 Albrecht von Graefe (1828–1870) (Germany) probably the most important ophthalmologist of the nineteenth century, along with Helmholtz and Donders, one of the 'founding fathers' of ophthalmology as a specialty, he was a brilliant clinician and charismatic teacher who had an international influence on the development of ophthalmology, and was a pioneer in mapping visual field defects and diagnosis and treatment of glaucoma, and he introduced a cataract extraction technique that remained the standard for more than 100 years, and many other important surgical techniques such as iridectomy. He rationalised the use of many ophthalmically important drugs, including mydriatics and miotics; he also was the founder of one of the earliest ophthalmic societies (German Ophthalmological Society, 1857) and one of the earliest ophthalmic journals (Graefe's Archives of Ophthalmology)

 Allvar Gullstrand (1862–1930) (Sweden) was a Nobel Prize-winner in 1911 for his research on the eye as a light-refracting apparatus, he described the 'schematic eye', a mathematical model of the human eye based on his measurements known as the 'optical constants' of the eye; his measurements are still used today
 Hermann von Helmholtz (1821–1894), a great German polymath, invented the ophthalmoscope (1851) and published important work on physiological optics, including colour vision.
 Julius Hirschberg (1843–1925) (Germany) in 1879 became the first to use an electromagnet to remove metallic foreign bodies from the eye and in 1886 developed the Hirschberg test for measuring strabismus
 Peter Adolph Gad (1846 – 1907), Danish ophthalmologist who founded the first eye infirmary in São Paulo, Brazil
 Socrate Polara (1800–1860, Italy) founded the first dedicated ophthalmology clinic in Sicily in 1829, entirely as a philanthropic endeavor; later he was appointed as the first director of the ophthalmology department at the Grand Hospital of Palermo, Sicily, in 1831 after the Sicilian government became convinced of the importance of state support for the specialization
 Herman Snellen (1834–1908) (Netherlands) introduced the Snellen chart to study visual acuity

20th–21st centuries
 Vladimir Petrovich Filatov (1875–1956) (Ukraine) contributed the tube flap grafting method, corneal transplantation, and preservation of grafts from cadaver eyes and tissue therapy; he founded the Filatov Institute of Eye Diseases and Tissue Therapy, Odessa, one of the leading eye-care institutes in the world
 Shinobu Ishihara (1879-1963) (Japan), in 1918, invented the Ishihara Color Vision Test, a common method for determining Color blindness; he also made major contributions to the study of Trachoma and Myopia
 Ignacio Barraquer (1884–1965) (Spain), in 1917, invented the first motorized vacuum instrument (erisophake) for intracapsular cataract extraction; he founded the Barraquer Clinic in 1941 and the Barraquer Institute in 1947 in Barcelona, Spain
 Ernst Fuchs (1851-1930) was an Austrian ophthalmologist known for his discovery and description of numerous ocular diseases and abnormalities including Fuchs' dystrophy and Fuchs heterochromic iridocyclitis
 Tsutomu Sato (1902-1960) (Japan) pioneer in incisional refractive surgery, including techniques for astigmatism and the invention of radial keratotomy for myopia
 Jules Gonin (1870–1935) (Switzerland) was the "father of retinal detachment surgery"
 Sir Harold Ridley (1906–2001) (United Kingdom), in 1949, may have been the first to successfully implant an artificial intraocular lens after observing that plastic fragments in the eyes of wartime pilots were well tolerated; he fought for decades against strong reactionary opinions to have the concept accepted as feasible and useful
 Charles Schepens (1912–2006) (Belgium) was the "father of modern retinal surgery" and developer of the Schepens indirect binocular ophthalmoscope whilst at Moorfields Eye Hospital; he was the founder of the Schepens Eye Research Institute, associated with Harvard Medical School and the Massachusetts Eye and Ear Infirmary, in Boston, Massachusetts
Tom Pashby (1915–2005) (Canada) was Canadian Standards Association and a sport safety advocate to prevent eye injuries and spinal cord injuries, developed safer sports equipment, named to the Order of Canada, inducted into Canada's Sport Hall of Fame
 Marshall M. Parks (1918–2005) was the "father of pediatric ophthalmology"
 José Ignacio Barraquer (1916–1998) (Spain) was the "father of modern refractive surgery" and in the 1960s, he developed lamellar techniques, including keratomileusis and keratophakia, as well as the first microkeratome and corneal microlathe 
 Tadeusz Krwawicz (1910–1988) (Poland), in 1961, developed the first cryoprobe for intracapsular cataract extraction
 Svyatoslav Fyodorov (1927–2000) (Russia) was the "father of ophthalmic microsurgery" and he improved and popularized radial keratotomy, invented a surgical cure for cataract, and he developed scleroplasty
 Charles Kelman (1930–2004)(United States) developed the ultrasound and mechanized irrigation and aspiration system for phacoemulsification, first allowing cataract extraction through a small incision.
 Helena Ndume (b.1960) (Namibia) is a renowned ophthalmologist notable for her charitable work among people with eye-related illnesses.

See also

 Book of the Ten Treatises of the Eye
 Chinese ophthalmology
 Copiale cipher
 American Academy of Ophthalmology
 European Board of Ophthalmology
 Association for Research in Vision and Ophthalmology
 EyeWiki
 Eye disease
 List of systemic diseases with ocular manifestations
 Eye surgery
 Optometry
 Orthoptics
 Eye care professional

References

External links

 EyeWiki
 Multilingual illustrated Dictionary of Ophthalmology
 Aaojournal

 
Surgical specialties